The 1972 Icelandic Cup was the 13th edition of the National Football Cup.

It took place between 19 June 1972 and 12 November 1972, with the final played at Melavöllur in Reykjavik.

The Cup was important, as the winner qualified for the UEFA Cup Winners' Cup. (If a club won both the league and the cup, the losing finalists would take their place in the Cup Winners' Cup).

Clubs from the 1. Deild did not enter until the last 16, while clubs from lower divisions had already played 3 preliminary rounds. In case of a draw, the match was replayed at the ground of the other team.

ÍBV Vestmannaeyjar won their second Icelandic Cup, after winning the 1968 Icelandic Cup and beating 2. Deild club FH Hafnarfjörður in the final.

First round

Second round

Third round

Last 16 
 Entry of the 8 teams from the 1. Deild

Quarter finals

Semi finals

Final 

 ÍBV Vestmannaeyjar won their second Icelandic Cup and qualified for the 1973–74 European Cup Winners' Cup.

See also 

 1972 Úrvalsdeild
 Icelandic Cup

External links 
 1972 Icelandic Cup results at the site of the Icelandic Football Federation 

Icelandic Men's Football Cup
Iceland
1972 in Iceland